The Charmante class was a group of five 32-gun/12-pounder frigates of the French Navy, built during the late 1770s at Brest (lead ship) Nantes (2 ships) and Saint Malo (2 ships). They were designed by Jean-Denis Chevillard. Of the five ships, two were wrecked, two were captured by the British, and one by the Spanish.

 Charmante
Builder: Brest
Ordered:
Laid down: April 1777
Launched: 30 August 1777
Completed: January 1778
Fate: Wrecked on the Chaussée de Sein on 24 March 1780

 Junon
Builder: Rochefort
Ordered:
Laid down: September 1777
Launched:  March 1778
Completed:  May 1778
Fate: Wrecked by the Great Hurricane of 1780 off Saint Vincent on 11 October 1780

 Gracieuse
Builder: Rochefort
Ordered:
Laid down: November 1785
Launched:  18 May 1787
Completed:  May 1788
Fate: Renamed Unité on 28 September 1793. Capturd by the British on 11 April 1796, recomissionned as HMS Unite, sold in 1802

 Inconstante
Builder: Rochefort
Ordered:
Laid down: January 1789
Launched: 9 September 1790
Completed: February 1791
Fate: Captured by HMS Penelope and Iphigenia on 25 November 1793 off Saint Domingue and recommissioned in the Royal Navy as HMS Convert

 Hélène
Builder: Rochefort
Ordered:
Laid down: 1789
Launched: 18 May 1791
Completed: June 1792
Fate: Captured by the Spanish on 19 February 1793 during the French expedition to Sardinia and recommissioned in the Spanish Navy as Sirena

Citations

References
 
 
 

 
Frigate classes
Ship classes of the French Navy